The Duchy of Brunswick-Lüneburg, or more properly the Duchy of Brunswick and Lüneburg, was a historical duchy that existed from the late Middle Ages to the Late Modern era within the Holy Roman Empire, until the year of its dissolution. The duchy was located in what is now northwestern Germany. Its name came from the two largest cities in the territory: Brunswick and Lüneburg.

The dukedom emerged in 1235 from the allodial lands of the House of Welf in Saxony and was granted as an imperial fief to Otto the Child, a grandson of Henry the Lion. The duchy was divided several times during the High Middle Ages amongst various lines of the House of Welf, but each ruler was styled "Duke of Brunswick-Lüneburg" in addition to his own particular title. By 1692, the territories had consolidated to two: the Electorate of Brunswick-Lüneburg (commonly known as Electorate of Hanover) and the Principality of Brunswick-Wolfenbüttel.

In 1714, the Hanoverian branch of the family succeeded to the throne of Great Britain, which they ruled in personal union with Hanover until 1837. For this reason, many cities and provinces in former British colonies are named after Brunswick or Lüneburg. The Hanoverians never ruled Brunswick while they held the British throne, as the city was part of neighbouring Brunswick-Wolfenbüttel. After the Congress of Vienna in 1814/15, the Brunswick-Lüneburg territories became the Kingdom of Hanover and the Duchy of Brunswick.

History 

When the imperial ban was placed on Henry the Lion in 1180, he lost his titles as Duke of Saxony and Duke of Bavaria. He went into exile for several years, but was then allowed to stay on the (allodial) estates inherited from his mother's side until the end of his life.

At the Imperial Diet of 1235 in Mainz, as part of the reconciliation between the Hohenstaufen and Welf families, Henry's grandson, Otto the Child, transferred his estates to Emperor Frederick II and was enfeoffed in return with the newly created Duchy of Brunswick-Lüneburg, which was formed from the estates transferred to the Emperor as well as other large areas of the imperial fisc. After his death in 1252, he was succeeded by his sons, Albert the Tall and John, who ruled the dukedom jointly.

In 1269 the duchy was divided, Albert receiving the southern part of the state around Brunswick and John the northern territories in the area of Lüneburg. The towns of Lüneburg and Brunswick remained in the overall possession of the House of Welf until 1512 and 1671 respectively. In 1571 the Amt of Calvörde became an exclave of the Duchy. The various parts of the duchy were further divided and re-united over the centuries, all of them being ruled by the Welf or Guelph dynasty, who maintained close relations with one another—not infrequently by marrying cousins—a practice far more common than is the case today, even among the peasantry of the Holy Roman Empire, for the salic inheritance laws in effect, encouraged the practice of retaining control of lands and benefits. The seats of power moved in the meantime from Brunswick and Lüneburg to Celle and Wolfenbüttel as the towns asserted their independence.

History of the subordinate principalities 

The subsequent history of the dukedom and its subordinate principalities was characterised by numerous divisions and reunifications. The subordinate states that were repeatedly created, and which had the legal status of principalities, were generally named after the residence of their rulers.

The estates of the different dynastic lines could be inherited by a side line when a particular family died out. For example, over the course of the centuries there were the Old, Middle and New Houses (or Lines) of Brunswick, and the Old, Middle and New Houses of Lüneburg. The number of simultaneously reigning dynastic lines varied from two to five.

Principality of Brunswick-Wolfenbüttel 

In 1269 the Principality of Brunswick was formed following the first division of the Duchy of Brunswick-Lüneburg. In 1432, as a result of increasing tensions with the townsfolk of Brunswick, the Brunswick Line moved their Residence to Wolfenbüttel, into the water castle, which was expanded into a Schloss, whilst the town was developed into a royal seat. The name Wolfenbüttel was given to this principality. From 1546 Wolfenbüttel became the residence of the senior prince of Brunswick-Lüneburg, Henry, Duke of Brunswick-Dannenberg.

With sole rights to the duchy Brunswick-Lüneburg, he provided a conditional sub-lease of the principality of Lüneburg to the princes of Calenburg with the conditions of payment to the Wolfenbüttel heirs (Chief of the House), together with the guarantee that only his descendants would inherit this senior principality of Wolfenbüttel.  Not until 1753/1754 was the Residence moved back to Brunswick, into the newly built Brunswick Palace. In 1814 the principality became the Duchy of Brunswick, with its own subordinate principalities that are all apart from the Calenburg principality from which sprang the de facto Kingdom of Hanover. Hanover being the Junior branch, and Wolfenbüttel the Elder.

The very temporary Kingdom of Hanover and immediately disputed new Duchy was deemed illegally formed as not allowed to be done by the Junior branch (Hanover's Regency) while the Chief prince Charles II was awaiting to come of age in 1821. When he came of age there was immediate confrontation and open protests on an annual and consistent basis. The new constitution of Brunswick was declared illegal, as well as all new laws passed by Hanover during their Regency.

These acts were officially declared as an English invasion and usurpation in the edict of Charles II of Brunswick-Wolfenbüttel on May 10, 1827. In the 10th year of his reign he was driven from the Duchy, and had since condemned these treasonous acts of his brother and Hanover as capital offenses, and sentenced them as such. France, the UK and the USA co-signed treaties that would have ousted Hanover and placed them in the hands of Charles II, had they followed through.

In 1866 Prussia annexed the territories and refused to recognize the Kingdom of Hanover or any of those new titles. Prince Charles II of Brunswick-Wolfenbüttel also protested these violent annexations from his places of exile in Paris, as well as Geneva Switzerland, and from the UK. His protests included repudiations of the new entities and titles created by the Council of Vienna, most of which were published in the Gazette on an annual basis. Prussia recognized Duke Charles II as the rightful Duke, although in exile.

Most countries agreed as well, that he remained the de jure (and 10 years de facto) Duke and recognized all his execution of office as de facto. These recognitions were consistent with what transpired from his signed and sealed will dated the 12th of April 1873. The whole world unanimously honored his will which stated Hanover and his brother were (after having been condemned to death) not his natural family. The text included all the domains, estates, etc of Brunswick were transferred to Geveva. Otto von Bismark honored the treaty in sending financial assets of the domains of Brunswick to Geneva.

Principality of Calenberg (later Electorate of Brunswick-Lüneburg) 

In 1432 the estates gained by the Principality of Brunswick-Wolfenbüttel between the Deister and Leine split away as the Principality of Calenberg.
To the north this new state bordered on the County of Hoya near Nienburg and extended from there in a narrow, winding strip southwards up the River Leine through Wunstorf and Hanover where it reached the Principality of Wolfenbüttel. In 1495 it was expanded around Göttingen. In 1584 it went back to the Wolfenbüttel Line.

In 1634, as a result of inheritance distributions, it went to the House of Lüneburg, before becoming an independent principality again in 1635, when it was given to George, younger brother of Prince Ernest II of Lüneburg, who chose Hanover as his Residenz. New territory was added in 1665 in the vicinity of Grubenhagen and in 1705 around the Principality of Lüneburg. In 1692 Duke Ernest Augustus from the Calenberg Line acquired the right to be a prince-elector as the Prince-Elector of Brunswick-Lüneburg. Colloquially the Electorate was also known as the Electorate of Hanover or as Kurhannover. In 1814 it was succeeded by the Kingdom of Hanover.

Principality of Lüneburg 

The Principality of Lüneburg emerged alongside the Principality of Brunswick in 1269 when the inheritance of the Duchy was divided. After the death of Duke George William of Brunswick-Lüneburg in 1705, King George I inherited the state of Lüneburg, being both the benefactor of Georges William's 1658 renunciation in favour of his younger brother Ernest Augustus and the husband of the Duke's morganatic daughter, Sophie Dorothea, later known as the "Princess of Ahlden". It was united with the Principality of Calenberg, which had been elevated in 1692 into the Electorate.

Principality of Göttingen 

The southernmost principality in the Duchy of Brunswick-Lüneburg stretched from Münden in the south down the River Weser to Holzminden. In the east it ran through Göttingen along the River Leine via Northeim to Einbeck. It emerged in 1345 as the result of a division of the Principality of Brunswick and was united in 1495 with Calenberg.

Principality of Grubenhagen 

From 1291 to 1596 Grubenhagen was an independent principality, its first ruler being Henry the Admirable, son of Albert of Brunswick-Wolfenbüttel. The state lay ran from the northern part of the Solling hills and the River Leine near Einbeck and north of the Eichsfeld on and in the southwestern Harz. After being split in the course of the years into smaller and smaller principalities it Grubenhagen finally returned in 1596 to Brunswick-Wolfenbüttel.

Other branches 
Other branches that did not have full sovereignty existed in the Dannenberg, Harburg, Gifhorn, Bevern, Osterode, Herzberg, Salzderhelden and Einbeck.

While a total of about a dozen subdivisions that existed, some were only dynastic and not recognised as states of the Empire, which at one time had over 1500 such legally recognized entities. In the List of Reichstag participants (1792), the following four subdivisions of Brunswick-Lüneburg had recognized representation:
 The Principality of Lüneburg.
 The Principality of Calenberg-Göttingen, merged under Eric I of Brunswick-Wolfenbüttel in 1495.
 The Principality of Grubenhagen.
 The Principality of Brunswick-Wolfenbüttel.

By 1705 only two Dukes of Brunswick-Lüneburg survived, one ruling Calenberg, Lüneburg and other possessions, and the other ruling Wolfenbüttel.

From Lüneburg to Hanover

One of the dynastic lines was that of the princes of Lüneburg, who in 1635 acquired Calenberg for George, a junior member of the family who set up residence in the city of Hanover. His son Christian Louis and his brothers inherited Celle in 1648 and thereafter shared it and Calenberg between themselves; a closely related branch of the family ruled separately in Wolfenbüttel.

As a latter day development, what became the Electorate of Hanover was initially called the Elector of Brunswick-Lunenberg when the Holy Roman Emperor appointed Ernest Augustus, Duke of Brunswick-Lunenberg an Elector in 1696 (two years before his death) in a somewhat controversial move to increase the number of Protestant electors—thereby offending the entrenched interests of the extant prince-electors who would no longer be so few. As with most matters in Europe during these times, this was part of the centuries-long religious unrest accompanied by outright warfare (see Thirty Years' War) triggered by the zealous advocates on either side of the Protestant Reformation and the Catholic Counter-Reformation.

The territories of Calenberg and Lüneburg-Celle were made an Electorate by the Emperor Leopold I in 1692 in expectation of the imminent inheritance of Celle by the Duke of Calenberg, though the actual dynastic union of the territories did not occur until 1705 under his son George I Louis, and the Electorate was not officially approved by the Imperial Diet until 1708.

The resulting state was known under many different names (Brunswick-Lüneburg, Calenberg, Calenberg-Celle; its ruler was often known as the "Elector of Hanover". Coincidentally, in 1701 the Duke of Brunswick-Lüneburg found himself in the line of succession for the British crown, later confirmed in 1707 by the Act of Union, which he subsequently inherited, thereby creating a personal union of the two crowns on 20 October 1714.

After a little over a decade, the matter of the disputed electorate was settled upon the heir, and the new Duke of Brunswick-Lüneburg (acceded as duke on 23 January 1698), George I Louis was able to style himself the Elector of Brunswick and Lüneburg from 1708. It was not just happenstance but similar religious driven politics that brought about the circumstance that he was also put into the line of succession for the British crown by the Act of Settlement— which was written to ensure a Protestant succession to the thrones of Scotland and England at a time when anti-Catholic sentiment ran high in much of Northern Europe and much of Great Britain.

In the event, George I succeeded his second cousin Anne, Queen of Great Britain — the last reigning member of the House of Stuart, and subsequently formed a personal union from 1 August 1714 between the British crown and the duchy of Brunswick-Lüneburg (electorate of Hanover) which would last until well after the end of the Napoleonic wars more than a century later—including even through the dissolution of the Holy Roman Empire and the rise of a new successor kingdom. In that manner, the "Electorate of Hanover" (the core duchy) was enlarged with the addition of other lands and became the kingdom of Hanover in 1814 at the peace conferences (Congress of Vienna) settling the future shape of Europe in the aftermath of the Napoleonic wars.

History of the relationship to the British Crown
The first Hanoverian King of Great Britain, George I of Great Britain, was the reigning Duke of Brunswick-Lüneburg, and was finally made an official and recognized prince-elector of the Holy Roman Empire in 1708. His possessions were enlarged in 1706 when the hereditary lands of the Calenberg branch of the Dukes of Brunswick-Lüneburg merged with the lands of the Lüneburg-Celle branch to form the state of Hanover. Subsequently, George I was referred to as Elector of Hanover.

In 1700 and 1701, when the English Parliament had addressed the question of an orderly succession, with a particular religious bias toward a Protestant ruler, from the childless ruling Queen Anne (House of Stuart), it passed the provisions of the Act of Settlement 1701 to Sophia of Hanover, granddaughter of James I. Sophia predeceased Queen Anne by a few weeks, but her son and heir, George I, succeeded as King of Great Britain when Anne, his second cousin, died in August 1714. Great Britain and Hanover remained united in personal union until the accession of Queen Victoria in 1837.

George I was followed by his son George II and great-grandson George III. The last mentioned retained the position of elector even after the Holy Roman Empire was abolished by its last emperor in 1806. George III contested the validity of the dissolution of the Empire and maintained separate consular offices and staff for the Electorate of Hanover until the peace conferences at the war's end. After the fall of Napoleon, George III regained his lands plus lands from Prussia as King of Hanover, whilst giving up some other smaller scattered territories.

After the Congress of Vienna
After the end of the Holy Roman Empire in 1806, Calenberg-Celle and its possessions were added to by the Congress of Vienna ending the Napoleonic war, being born anew under the name of Kingdom of Hanover (including Brunswick-Lüneburg). During the first half of the 19th century, the Kingdom of Hanover was ruled as personal union by the British crown from its creation under George III of the United Kingdom, the last elector of Hanover until the death of William IV in 1837. At that point, the crown of Hanover went to William's younger brother, Ernest, Duke of Cumberland and Teviotdale under the Salic laws requiring the next male heir to inherit, whereas the British throne was inherited by an elder brother's only daughter, Queen Victoria.

Subsequently, the kingdom was lost in 1866 by his son George V of Hanover during the Austro-Prussian War when it was annexed by Prussia, and became the Prussian province of Hanover.

Duchy of Brunswick 

The Wolfenbüttel Line retained its independence, except from 1807 to 1813, when it and Hanover were merged into the Napoleonic Kingdom of Westphalia. The Congress of Vienna of 1815 turned it into an independent state under the name Duchy of Brunswick. The Duchy remained independent and joined first the North German Confederation and in 1871 the German Empire.

When the main line of descent became extinct in 1884, the German Emperor withheld the rightful heir, the Crown Prince of Hanover, from taking control, instead installing a regent. Decades later, the families were reconciled by the marriage of the Crown Prince's son to the Emperor's only daughter, and the Emperor allowed his son-in-law to assume rule (his father having renounced his own right).

Dukes of Brunswick-Lüneburg and successors

House of Welf

Partitions of Brunswick-Lüneburg under Welf rule

Table of rulers

See also
 Electorate of Hanover
 Duchy of Brunswick
 Duchy of Gifhorn
 Principality of Brunswick-Wolfenbüttel
 Principality of Calenberg
 Principality of Grubenhagen
 Principality of Göttingen
 Principality of Lüneburg
 Brunswick-Bevern
 House of Hanover
 House of Welf
 List of the rulers of Lüneburg
 List of the rulers of Brunswick-Wolfenbüttel

References

External links 
 Map of Lower Saxony 1789
 Royalty guide - Braunschweig
 Royalty guide - Braunschweig-Lüneburg

 
1230s establishments in the Holy Roman Empire
1235 establishments in Europe
1806 disestablishments in the Holy Roman Empire
States and territories established in 1235
Duchies of the Holy Roman Empire
Lower Saxon Circle
Former monarchies of Europe
Former duchies